Antisemitic tropes, canards, or myths are "sensational reports, misrepresentations, or fabrications" that are defamatory towards Judaism as a religion or defamatory towards Jews as an ethnic or religious group. Since the Middle Ages, such reports have been a recurring motif of broader antisemitic conspiracy theories.

Some antisemitic tropes or false accusations date back to the birth of Christianity, such as the allegation that the Jews are collectively responsible for the crucifixion of Jesus. In Medieval Europe, the scope of antisemitic tropes expanded and became the basis for regular persecutions and formal expulsions of Jews in England, France, Germany, Spain and Portugal. During these times, it was widely believed that Jews caused epidemics like the Black Death by poisoning wells. Jews were also accused of ritually consuming the blood of Christians.

Starting in the 19th century, the notion first emerged that Jews were plotting to establish control over the world and dominate it by promoting capitalism and engaging in banking and finance. In the 20th century, other antisemitic tropes alleged that Jews were responsible for the propagation of Communism and trying to dominate the news media. Those antisemitic tropes, which had political and economic contexts, became political myths central to the worldview of Adolf Hitler, and persist to the present day.

Holocaust denial is also considered an antisemitic conspiracy theory because of its position that the Holocaust was a hoax or misrepresentation and was designed to advance the interests of Jews and/or justify the creation of the State of Israel.

Economic and political tropes

World domination

The publication of The Protocols of the Elders of Zion in 1903 is usually considered the beginning of contemporary conspiracy theory literature.

This trope often manifests as both writings and graphic imagery that seek to accuse Jews (or their supporters) of trying to control the world for nefarious means. Examples of this imagery include Nazi cartoons that depict Jews as octopuses, encircling the globe. A more recent example is the 2001 re-printing in Egypt of Henry Ford's antisemitic text The International Jew, with the same octopus imagery on the front cover.

Among the earliest refutations of The Protocols as a forgery were a series of articles printed in The Times of London in 1921. This series revealed that much of the material in The Protocols was plagiarized from The Dialogue in Hell Between Machiavelli and Montesquieu, an earlier political satire that did not have an antisemitic theme. Since 1903, when The Protocols first appeared in print, its earliest publishers have offered vague and often contradictory testimony detailing how they obtained their copies of the rumored original manuscript.

The text was popularized by supporters of the Tsarist regime. Such supporters, in an effort to discredit the Bolshevik movement that succeeded their regime, claimed that the Jews were the conspirators behind the Russian revolution and held power within the Bolshevik regime, a claim later picked up by the Nazis. The protocols falsely conclude that Communism was fabricated by the Jews for the purpose of stirring up a political revolution to destabilize society, ultimately gaining control and instituting a repressive transnational political system amid the chaos. By framing the Jews as a central conniving power, the protocols developed and popularized the theory of Jewish domination for the sake of preserving monarchic systems, blaming Jews for attempting to undermine Christianity. In this way, the antisemitic world domination trope weaponized the long-standing tendency to use Jews as scapegoats, turning it into a conspiracy theory. This distinctive brand of Jewish scapegoating sought to release anxiety at instability and political change in society—especially rupture that threatened groups and governments that had historically been in power and in the majority—by casting social change as the scheming of Jews eager to undermine the status quo.

These allegations quickly spread Westward from 1920 onward.  The Great Depression and the rise of Nazism were important developments in the history of The Protocols, and the hoax continued to be published and circulated despite its debunking. Despite the fact that numerous independent investigations have repeatedly proven The Protocols to be a plagiarism and a literary forgery, the hoax is still frequently quoted and reprinted by antisemites, and is sometimes used as evidence of an alleged Jewish cabal by antisemitic groups in the United States and in the Middle East.

Nazi propagandists, accusing "international Jewry" of plotting and extending World War II through its supposed control of Allied governments, threatened to annihilate the Jews as justified retaliation.

Another world-domination conspiracy goes by the name Zionist Occupation Government (ZOG) and various other names, and it claims that Jews secretly control the governments of Western states. The expression is used by white supremacist, white nationalist, far right, nativist, black nationalist, or antisemitic groups in the United States and Europe, as well as by ultra-nationalists such as Svoboda in Ukraine.

On 16 October 2003, the Malaysian Prime Minister Mahathir Mohammed drew a standing ovation at the 57-member Organisation of the Islamic Conference for his speech, in which he said: "today the Jews rule this world by proxy. They get others to fight and die for them ... They invented socialism, communism, human rights and democracy so that persecuting them would appear to be wrong so that they can enjoy equal rights with others. With these, they have gained control of the most powerful countries and they, this tiny community, have become a world power." He further urged Muslims to emulate Jews in this regard in order to achieve similar results.

In April 2017, Politico magazine published an article purporting to show links between U.S. President Donald Trump, Russian President Vladimir Putin and the Jewish outreach organization Chabad-Lubavitch. The article was condemned. Jonathan Greenblatt, the head of the Anti-Defamation League, said that it "evokes age-old myths about Jews".

The trope of Jewish governmental and international domination often appears in the twenty-first century in coded terms that cast Jewish domination plots as the exploits of elite individuals, and like with the history of the protocols, this often seeks to scapegoat Jews for orchestrating broader political changes or perpetuating great social ills. For example, it has been linked with the conspiracy theory QAnon, a conspiracy theory which purports that a secret, evil cabal of global elites is harvesting children for world power. The trope of the globalist is another example of the coded deployment of this antisemitic idea of Jewish world domination.

Two-time heavyweight world champion Tyson Fury has spoken of his belief in a Jewish/Zionist plot to brainwash people and lower moral standards by utilising influence held in the media and financial industries.

According to Gustavo Perednik, unlike any other group hatred, antisemitism tries to disguise brutal instincts as a struggle against "the powerful" embodied in the Jew, no matter how defenceless the actual victim.

Controlling the media

One antisemitic cliché is that "the Jews control the media" and Hollywood. Historically, it has been traced to discredited early 20th-century publications such as The Protocols of the Elders of Zion (1903) and to Henry Ford's Dearborn Independent. Despite the fact that he opposed antisemitism during the Hilsner affair, Czech politician Tomáš Garrigue Masaryk believed that Jews controlled the press and helped the nascent state of Czechoslovakia during its struggle for independence. Czech historian Jan Láníček comments that "The great philosopher and humanist Masaryk was still using the same anti-Semitic trope found at the bottom of all anti-Jewish accusations."

J. J. Goldberg, editorial director of the newspaper The Forward, in 1997 published a study of this myth regarding the United States, concluding that, although Jews do hold many prominent positions in the U.S. media industry, they "do not make a high priority of Jewish concerns" and that Jewish Americans generally perceive the media as anti-Israel. Variants on this theme have focused on Hollywood, the press, and the music industry.

Attorney and scholar Alan Dershowitz said of the subject:

Controlling the global financial system

The Anti-Defamation League (ADL) documented various antisemitic tropes concerning Jews and banking, including the myth that world banking is dominated by the Rothschild family, the myth that Jews control Wall Street, and the myth that Jews control the United States Federal Reserve. The ADL has said the trope is traceable to the prevalence of Jews in the money-lending profession in Europe during the Middle Ages due to a prohibition against Christians in that profession. The Protocols of the Elders of Zion repeats this trope.

In an article about tropes which accuse Jews of controlling the global financial system, the anti-racist activist Tim Wise wrote:

Usury and profiteering

In the Middle Ages, Jews were ostracized from most professions by the Christian Church and the guilds and were pushed into marginal occupations considered socially inferior, such as tax and rent collecting and moneylending. At the same time, church law and rulings prohibited Christians from charging interest. For instance, the Third Council of the Lateran of 1179 threatened excommunication for any Christian lending money at interest. People who wanted or needed to borrow money thus often turned to Jews. This was said to show Jews were insolent, greedy usurers. Natural tensions between creditors and debtors were added to social, political, religious, and economic strains.

Peasants who were forced to pay their taxes to Jews could personify them as the people taking their earnings while remaining loyal to the lords on whose behalf Jews worked. Gentile debtors may have been quick to lay charges of usury against Jewish moneylenders charging even nominal interest or fees. Thus, historically attacks on usury have often been linked to antisemitism.

In England, the departing Crusaders were joined by crowds of debtors in the massacres of Jews at London and York in 1189–1190. In 1275, Edward I of England passed the Statute of Jewry which made usury illegal and linked it to blasphemy, in order to seize the assets of the violators. Scores of English Jews were arrested, 300 hanged and their property went to the Crown. In 1290, all Jews were expelled from England, allowed to take only what they could carry, the rest of their property became the Crown's. The usury was cited as the official reason for the Edict of Expulsion. According to Walter Laqueur,

During World War I, Alfred Roth claimed, without evidence, that Jews in the German Army were profiteers, spies and defeatists.

"Kosher tax"

The "Kosher tax" (or "Jewish tax") trope claims that food producers are forced to pay an exorbitant amount to obtain the right to display a symbol on their products that indicates it is kosher, and that this cost is secretly passed on to consumers through higher prices which constitute a "kosher tax". It is mainly spread by antisemitic white supremacist and other extremist organizations.

Refuters of this trope state that if it were not profitable to obtain such certification, then food producers would not engage in the certification process, and that the increased sales resulting from kosher certification actually lower the overall cost per item. Obtaining certification that an item is kosher is a voluntary business decision made by companies desiring additional sales from consumers (both Jewish and non-Jewish) who look for kosher certification when shopping, and is sought by marketing departments of food production companies.

Propagation of communism

In the 20th century allegations started to surface that Jews were responsible for the propagation of Communism, the most notorious example being The Protocols of the Elders of Zion (1903).

The term "Judeo-Bolshevism" was adopted and used in Nazi Germany to refer to Jews and communists together, implying that the communist movement served Jewish interests.

Religious tropes

Guilt for the death of Jesus

The blame for the death of Jesus has often been placed on Jews.  has been invoked to blame Jews "throughout generations":

These verses appear in a narrative in which there was a custom of releasing "a prisoner". This content appears nowhere in the Bible except in Matthew. According to The New Oxford Annotated Bible there is no independent evidence of the custom, and the word "children" refers to the generation that lived to see the destruction of "Jerusalem in 70 CE" and "not all subsequent Jews".

During the Second Vatican Council which was held from 1962 to 1965, the Roman Catholic Church under Pope Paul VI issued the document , which repudiated the belief that Jews are collectively guilty for the Crucifixion of Jesus.

Host desecration

During the Middle Ages in Europe, it was claimed that Jews stole consecrated Hosts, or communion wafers, and desecrated them to reenact the crucifixion of Jesus by stabbing or burning the host or otherwise misusing it. The accusations were often supported only by the testimony of the accuser.

The first recorded accusation of host desecration by Jews was made in 1243 at Beelitz, near Berlin, and in consequence of it all the Jews of Beelitz were burned on the spot, subsequently called Judenberg.
Jeremy Cohen states that the first host desecration accusation occurred in 1290 in Paris and continues:

In the following centuries, similar accusations circulated throughout Europe, often accompanied by massacres. The accusation of host desecration gradually ceased after the Reformation when first Martin Luther in 1523 and then Sigismund August of Poland in 1558 were among those who repudiated the accusation. However, sporadic instances of host desecration libel occurred even in the 18th and 19th century. In 1761 in Nancy, several Jews from Alsace were executed on a charge of host desecration. The last recorded accusations were brought up in Barlad, Romania, in 1836 and 1867.

Ritual murder and blood libel

"The blood libel accusation, another famous anti-Semitic canard, is also a twelfth-century creation." The first recorded ritual murder accusation against Jews was that of William of Norwich, reported by a monk Thomas of Monmouth.

The descriptions of torture and human sacrifice in the antisemitic blood libels run contrary to many of the teachings of Judaism. The Ten Commandments forbid murder. The use of blood (human or otherwise) in cooking is prohibited by Kashrut and blood and other discharges from the human body are considered ritually unclean. The Bible (Old Testament) and Jewish teachings portray human sacrifice as one of the evils that separated the pagans of Canaan from the Hebrews. Jews were prohibited from engaging in these rituals and were punished for doing so. Ritual cleanliness for priests prohibited even being in the same room with a human corpse.

When "Church and secular leaders sharply denounced these defamations ... people refused to abandon this myth ... Popes, kings and emperors declared that Jews, if for no other reason than their strict dietary laws banning even the smallest drop of blood in meat or poultry, were incapable of the crime. The Christian populace was not impressed. In 1385, Geoffrey Chaucer published his Canterbury Tales which included 'The Prioress's Tale', an account of Jews murdering a deeply pious and innocent Christian boy. This blood libel became a part of English literary tradition."

Among those who refuted the blood libel against Jews were Holy Roman Emperor Frederick II in 1236: "we pronounce the Jews of the aforementioned place [Fulda] and the rest of the Jews in Germany completely absolved of this imputed crime"; Pope Gregory IX in a papal bull dated 7 October 1272: "We decree ... that Christians need not be obeyed against Jews in a case or situation of this type, and we order that Jews seized upon such a silly pretext be freed from imprisonment and that they shall not be arrested henceforth on such a miserable pretext, unless – which we do not believe – they be caught in the commission of the crime"; Pope Clement VI on 26 September 1348: "Jews are not responsible for the Plague."

Blood libel stories have appeared in modern times on many occasions in the state-sponsored media of a number of Arab and Muslim nations, their television shows and websites, and books alleging instances of the Jewish blood libels are not uncommon there.

Some Arab writers have condemned blood libel. The Egyptian newspaper Al-Ahram published a series of articles by Osama Al-Baz, a senior advisor to Egyptian President Hosni Mubarak. He explained the origins of the anti-Jewish blood libel and said that Arabs and Muslims have never been antisemitic as a group and urged people not to succumb to "myths" such as the blood libel.

Anti-Christian bias
Throughout the years, some antisemites within the Christian community have claimed that Jews either dislike Christianity or are trying to destroy it. On the Jews and Their Lies, which was written by Martin Luther, is one literary work which espouses this claim. The claim has continued to be espoused to the present day, with radio host James Edwards claiming that Jews "hate Christianity" and "the WASP establishment" and further claiming that Jews "are using pornography as a subversive tool against us".

The Anti-Defamation League has written the following statement on the subject:

Demonization, accusations of impurity

Jeremy Cohen writes:

Judensau (German for "Jew-sow") was a derogatory and dehumanizing image of Jews that appeared around the 13th century. Its popularity lasted for over 600 years and was revived by the Nazis. Jews, who were typically portrayed as having obscene contact with unclean animals such as pigs or owls or representing a devil, appeared on cathedral or church ceilings, pillars, utensils, etchings, etc.

Often, the images combined several antisemitic motifs and they also included derisive prose or poetry. Cohen continues:

More recently, "[t]he main recurrent motif in Arab cartoons concerning Israel is 'the devilish Jew and "[t]he core anti-Semitic motif of the Jew as the paradigm of absolute evil has a set of submotifs. These, in turn, recur over the centuries but are differently cloaked according to the predominant narrative of the period."

Male menstruation

The Christian belief that Jewish men menstruated, which appeared in the 16th century, was part of the overall antisemitic concept that all Jews were of feminine gender. This belief, first arising around 1500, was based on biblical passages connecting Jews with bleeding, which were however not suggesting anything in terms of gender. This was linked in the twelfth century with the so-called "blood curse" invoked by the Jews present at Jesus' trial before Pilate. In the following century, an allegedly rational explanation was added based on ancient humoral medicine, supplemented with a verse from the Psalms offered as an argument supporting the idea of anal bleeding as a supernatural punishment: "And he smote his enemies in the hinder parts" (Psalm 78:66, King James Version). Already in 1302 Christians alleged that Jewish men who were direct descendants of those who had taken responsibility for the crucifixion in the "blood curse" would suffer of a monthly bleeding. In 1503, an account of the ritual murder trials held in Tyrnau in 1494 contains the earliest mention of gendered, monthly bleeding.

In 17th-century Spain the old notion was recycled with the help of physicians, including the king's own, and combining the accusation of menstruation with that of hemorrhoids, at a time when there were efforts underway of establishing a legal concept of "impure blood" connected to family or caste. These have been interpreted as attempts at creating the legal notion of racial impurity.

Well poisoning

During the Black Death (often identified as bubonic plague epidemic) throughout the late Middle Ages, crowded cities were especially hard hit by the disease, with death tolls as high as 50% of the population. In their distress, emotionally distraught survivors searched for something, or someone, to blame. Jews proved to be a convenient scapegoat. The accusation entered into the repertoire of antisemitic language, showing up again in contexts as diverse as Stalin's doctors' plot and charges of Jews spreading AIDS or other infectious diseases.

A series of violent attacks broke out in Europe from 1348 to 1351 targeting Jewish communities blamed for an outbreak of the Black Death.

The first massacres directly related to the plague took place in April 1348 in Toulon, France, where the Jewish quarter was sacked, and forty Jews were murdered in their homes, then in Barcelona. In 1349, massacres and persecution spread across Europe, including the Erfurt massacre (1349), the Basel massacre, and massacres in Aragon and Flanders. Two thousand Jews were burned alive on 14 February 1349 in the Strasbourg massacre, where the plague had not yet affected the city.

Other tropes

Causing wars, revolutions, and calamities

 
As many European localities and entire countries expelled their Jewish populations after robbing them, and others denied them entrance, the legend of the Wandering Jew, a condemned harbinger of calamity, gained popularity. German politician Heinrich von Treitschke in the 19th century coined a phrase  ("The Jews are our misfortune!") adopted as a motto by  several decades later.

Efraim Karsh notes that "Jews have traditionally been accused of lacking true patriotism to their countries of citizenship, and instead seeking to embroil their non-Jewish compatriots in endless conflicts and wars on behalf of such cosmopolitan movements and ideals as 'world imperialism', 'international bolshevism', or 'world Zionism. According to Karsh, in the United States Jews were blamed for allegedly dragging the country into World War II and the Iraq War. He sees this as being related to exaggerated claims about the influence of the "Israel lobby".

The Franklin Prophecy was unknown before its appearance in 1934 in the pages of William Dudley Pelley's pro-Nazi weekly magazine Liberation. According to the US Congress report, Anti-Semitism in Europe: Hearing Before the Subcommittee on European Affairs of the Committee on Foreign Relations (2004):

Making people LGBT
In 2016, MEMRI highlighted a video in which a Kuwaiti Salafi preacher claimed that SpongeBob SquarePants and other children's cartoons were created by Jews in order to promote homosexuality, atheism, Satanism, and the emo movement.

In 2018, Nation of Islam leader Louis Farrakhan claimed that Jews are "turning men into women and women into men" and using a specially concocted strain of marijuana which is designed to make Black men gay and effeminate.

In 2020, conspiracy theorist Rick Wiles, through his website TruNews, endorsed a claim by self-identified Messianic Jews Steve and Jana Ben-Nun that Zionists seek to "make all of humanity androgynous" in accordance with the Kabbalistic concept of Adam Kadmon. The alleged plot supposedly involves Zionists supporting transgender rights, as well as actually making people LGBT by "putting specific things in food, in drink".

Provoking or fabricating antisemitism
During a speech at the Reichstag on 30 January 1939, Adolf Hitler ascribed the blame for the future "annihilation of the Jewish race in Europe" on international Jewish financiers who were seeking to start a world war.

In 2002, the Hamas leader Abdel Aziz al-Rantisi said, "People always talk about what the Germans did to the Jews, but the true question is, 'What did the Jews do to the Germans? Gilad Atzmon stated, "Jewish texts tend to glaze over the fact that Hitler's 28 March 1933, ordering a boycott against Jewish stores and goods, was an escalation in direct response to the declaration of war on Germany by the worldwide Jewish leadership."

In January 2005, 19 members of the Russian State Duma demanded that Judaism and Jewish organizations be banned in Russia. "Their seven-page letter ... accused Jews of carrying out ritual killings, controlling Russian and international capital, inciting ethnic strife in Russia, and staging hate crimes against themselves. 'The majority of antisemitic actions in the whole world are constantly carried out by Jews themselves with a goal of provocation', the letter claimed. After sharp protests were staged by Russian Jewish leaders, including Russia's Chief Rabbi Berel Lazar, human rights activists, and the Russian Foreign Ministry, Duma members retracted their appeal."

Dual loyalty
A trope found in The Protocols of the Elders of Zion, but dating to before that document, is that Jews are more loyal to world Jewry than to their own country. Since the establishment of the state of Israel, this trope has taken the form of accusations that Jewish citizens of other countries are more loyal to Israel than to their country of residence.

Cowardice and lack of patriotism

With the rise of racist theories in the 19th century, "[a]nother old anti-Semitic canard served to underline the putative 'femininity' of the Jewish race. Like women, Jews lacked an 'essence. In Genocide and Gross Human Rights Violations, Kurt Jonassohn and Karin S. Björnson wrote:

Jews were frequently accused of being insufficiently patriotic. In late 19th-century France, a political scandal known as the Dreyfus affair involved the wrongful conviction for treason of a young Jewish French officer. The political and judicial scandal ended with his full rehabilitation.

During World War I, the German Military High Command administered  (German for "Jewish Census"). It was designed to confirm allegations of the lack of patriotism among German Jews, but the results of the census disproved the accusations and were not made public. After the end of the war, the stab-in-the-back myth alleged that internal enemies, including Jews, were responsible for Germany's defeat.

In Stalin's Soviet Union, the statewide campaign against "rootless cosmopolitans" – a euphemism for Jews – was set out on 28 January 1949 with an article in the newspaper Pravda:

Racism

A number of books and websites which are run by Neo-Nazis, advocates of white supremacy, adherents of Christian Identity, and radical Islamist groups contain quotes which they claim are authoritative quotes from rabbinic literature, all in an attempt to prove their belief that Judaism is a racist religion which teaches its adherents to hate non-Jews by espousing the belief that they are not even human.

According to Rabbi Joseph Soloveitchik:

According to the record of a 1984 hearing before the Subcommittee on Human Rights and International Organizations in the US Congress concerning Soviet Jewry,

Inventing or exaggerating the Holocaust

Holocaust denial consists of claims that the genocide of Jews during World War II – usually referred to as the Holocaust – did not occur at all, or that it did not happen in the manner or to the extent which is historically recognized. Key elements of these claims are the rejection of any of the following: that the German Nazi government had a policy of deliberately targeting Jews for extermination as a people; that more than five million Jews were systematically killed by the Nazis and their allies; that genocide was carried out at extermination camps using tools of mass murder, such as gas chambers.

Most Holocaust denial claims imply, or openly state, that the Holocaust is a hoax arising out of a deliberate Jewish conspiracy to advance the interest of Jews at the expense of other peoples. For this reason, Holocaust denial is generally considered to be an antisemitic conspiracy theory. The methodologies of Holocaust deniers are criticized as based on a predetermined conclusion that ignores extensive historical evidence to the contrary.

Holocaust deniers include former Iranian President Mahmoud Ahmedinejad; Germar Rudolf, who had been convicted by a German court of inciting racial hatred; and the discredited author David Irving, who lost a libel action, Irving v Penguin Books Ltd, in 2000.

Controlling the 

Anti-Jewish propagandists have tried to exaggerate the role of Jews in the transatlantic slave trade. In the 1490s, the Jews were expelled from Spain and Portugal at a time when trade with the New World was opening up, leading to their participation in the Columbian exchange in general, and participation in the Atlantic slave trade in particular. Jewish participation in the slave trade was significant in Brazil, Curaçao, Suriname, and Rhode Island, but it was otherwise modest or minimal, and Jews had virtually no participation in the triangular slave trade that involved Northern European nations. The Nation of Islam published The Secret Relationship Between Blacks and Jews in 1991, which asserted that Jews played a major role in the Atlantic slave trade. The book was widely criticized as antisemitic and led to additional scholarly research on the subject, including books such as Jews and the American Slave Trade by Saul S. Friedman, which concluded that Jewish involvement in the slave trade was "minimal", and the accusations were an antisemitic trope. In 1995 the American Historical Association (AHA) issued a statement condemning "any statement alleging that Jews played a disproportionate role in the Atlantic slave trade".

Organ harvesting

Palestinians

In August 2009, an article in the Swedish tabloid Aftonbladet alleged that Israeli troops harvested organs from Palestinians that died in their custody. Henrik Bredberg wrote in the rival newspaper : "Donald Boström publicised a variant of an anti-Semitic classic, the Jew who abducts children and steals their blood." In a video on their website, Time magazine quoted the 2009 Swedish Aftonbladets unbacked variant of the classic antisemitic blood libel accusation as fact and retracted the allegations that Israeli soldiers had harvested and sold Palestinian organs in 2009 within hours on 24 August 2014 after a denouncing report from Honest Reporting came out.

In December 2009, Israel's Channel 2 published an interview with Yehuda Hiss, the former chief pathologist at L. Greenberg Institute of Forensic Medicine, where he said that workers at the forensic institute had informally and without permission taken skin, corneas, heart valves and bones from deceased Israelis, Palestinians and foreign workers during the 1990s. Hiss was dismissed as head of Abu Kabir in 2004 after discovery of the use of organs. Israeli officials acknowledged that incidents like that had taken place, but stated that the vast majority of cases involved Israeli citizens, that no such incidents had occurred for a long time, and that Hiss had been removed from his position.

Haiti
In the immediate aftermath of the 2010 Haiti earthquake, Israel sent 120 staff, doctors and troops of the Israel Defense Forces (IDF) to Port-au-Prince. The IDF set up a field hospital that performed 316 surgeries and delivered 16 babies.

On 18 January, an American activist, who was only known as T. West, posted a video on YouTube in which he called for Haitians to be wary of "personalities who are out for money" and he also called for Haitians to be particularly wary of the IDF. To explain his allegations, West stated that in the past "the IDF [had] participated in stealing organ transplants of Palestinians and others", thus echoing the Aftonbladet Israel controversy. West, who claimed to speak for a black-empowerment group called AfriSynergy Productions, stopped short of making more explicit accusations against the IDF's behaviour in Haiti but he noted that there was "little monitoring" of it in the quake's aftermath, insinuating that organ theft was at the very least a strong possibility. The Iranian state television station Press TV reported on the allegations and in a speech on 22 January, Ayatollah Ahmad Khatami said "There have been news reports that the Zionist regime, in the case of the catastrophe of Haiti, and under the pretext of providing relief to the people of Haiti, is stealing the organs of these wretched people", again without citing any evidence. On 27 January, a Syrian TV reporter described T. West's video as "document[ing] this heinous crime and ... show[ing] Israelis engaged in stealing organs from the earthquake victims" (despite the fact that the video quite evidently does no such thing). The original accusations were also relayed by a number of organizations often criticized for their antisemitism or anti-Israel positions, such as the websites of Al-Manar and former Ku Klux Klan Grand Wizard David Duke.

On 1 February 2010, the Gaza-based The Palestine Telegraph, of which Baroness Jenny Tonge was a patron at that time, published the claim that the IDF were secretly harvesting organs in Haiti and selling them on the black market, based on the above-mentioned YouTube video by T. West, in which video material was re-used from Hezbollah's Al-Manar television broadcast with no cited evidence to support it. In the United Kingdom, Baroness Jenny Tonge was removed from her role as Liberal Democrat health spokeswoman as a result of an interview in which she suggested that an independent inquiry should be established.

Israeli media and Jewish groups immediately fought back against the claims. In an interview with Ynetnews, West re-iterated his accusation about past incidents of organ theft by the IDF and cited Operation Bid Rig as further evidence of Jewish involvement in organ trafficking. The Anti-Defamation League responded, labeling West's allegations as antisemitic and as a "Big Lie", while an author for the Jewish Ledger referred to the rumors as a "blood libel".

9/11 attacks conspiracy

Some conspiracy theories hold that Jews or Israel played a key role in carrying out the September 11, 2001 attacks. According to a paper published by the Anti-Defamation League (ADL), "anti-Semitic conspiracy theories have not been accepted in mainstream circles in the U.S.", but "this is not the case in the Arab and Muslim world". A claim that 4,000 Jewish employees skipped work at the WTC on 11 September has been widely reported and widely debunked. The number of Jews who died in the attacks – typically estimated at around 400 – tracks closely with the proportion of Jews living in the New York area. Five Israelis died in the attack.

In 2003, the ADL published a report which attacked "hateful conspiracy theories" that the 9/11 attacks were carried out by Israelis and Jews, saying that they had the potential to "rationalize and fuel global anti-Semitism". The ADL's report found that "The Big Lie has united American far-right extremists and white supremacists and elements within the Arab and Muslim world". It asserted that many of the theories were modern manifestations of the 19th century Protocols of the Elders of Zion, which purported to map out a Jewish conspiracy for world domination. The ADL has characterized the Jeff Rense website as carrying antisemitic materials, such as "American Jews staged the 9/11 terrorist attacks for their own financial gain and to induce the American people to endorse wars of aggression and genocide on the nations of the Middle East and the theft of their resources for the benefit of Israel".

Contradictory accusations
A number of researchers noted the contradictions and irrationality which exist across antisemitic myths. Leon Pinsker noted as early as 1882:

In her 2003 book The Holocaust and Antisemitism: A Short History, Jocelyn Hellig wrote:

Gustavo Perednik
wrote in his book The Judeophobia:

Comments about tropes
According to defense attorney Kenneth Stern, "Historically, Jews have not fared well around conspiracy theories. Such ideas fuel anti-Semitism. The myths that all Jews are responsible for the death of Christ, or poisoned wells, or killed Christian children to bake matzos, or 'made up' the Holocaust, or plot to control the world, do not succeed each other; rather, the list of anti-Semitic canards gets longer."

See also

References

Further reading

External links
Antisemitism Uncovered: A Guide to Old Myths is a New Era. Anti-Defamation League.

 
Conspiracy theories
Tropes